On the Rock may refer to:
 On the Rock (Andrés Calamaro album)
 On the Rock (Israel Vibration album)

See also
 On the Rocks (disambiguation)